Ryan Whalen (born July 26, 1989) is a former American football wide receiver who played college football at Stanford. He was drafted by the Cincinnati Bengals in the sixth round, 167th overall of the 2011 NFL Draft.

Early years
A native of Alamo, California, Whalen graduated from Monte Vista High School in Danville, California, where he played for former Santa Clara quarterback Craig Bergman. As a senior, he hauled in 80 passes for over 1,200 yards and scored 14 touchdowns playing wide receiver, earning all-state honors. He was also named first team all-county, all-East Bay, all-metro by the San Francisco Chronicle and was named Scholar-Athlete of the Year. Following his senior season, he was named by Cal-Hi Sports as one of the Top 10 football/basketball players in the state of California.

Whalen was also an all-state basketball player at Monte Vista. He earned East Bay Athletic League Player of the Year and first team all-Alameda County honors and also earned first team all-East Bay and second team all-Metro honors after leading his team to its first North Coast Section championship.

College career
Whalen played at Stanford University for the Stanford Cardinal football team.

Professional career

Pre-draft

Cincinnati Bengals
Whalen was selected in the sixth round with the 167th overall pick of the 2011 NFL Draft by the Cincinnati Bengals. He became the first Stanford wide receiver to be drafted since the Oakland Raiders selected Teyo Johnson in the second round of the 2003 NFL Draft. Multiple news outlets, including Rotoworld.com and Bengals.com, reported that the Bengals had signed 167th overall pick WR Ryan Whalen on a four-year contract. The Bengals waived Whalen on August 25, 2014.

Minnesota Vikings
On August 2, 2015, Whalen joined the Minnesota Vikings as a free agent entering the 2015 season.

San Francisco 49ers
On August 23, 2016, Whalen was signed by the 49ers. On September 3, 2016, he was released by the 49ers.

NFL career statistics

References

External links
 

1989 births
Living people
American football wide receivers
Cincinnati Bengals players
Minnesota Vikings players
People from Alamo, California
People from Danville, California
Players of American football from California
San Francisco 49ers players
Sportspeople from the San Francisco Bay Area
Stanford Cardinal football players